Henry Charles Angelo the Younger (1780-1852) was a British master of fencing, part of the Angelo Family of fencers.

Early life
Henry was born in 1780 to Henry Angelo (1756-1835). He was the grandson of Domenico Angelo Malevolti Tremamondo (1716 or 1717 to 1802), the founder of the dynasty.

Career
The younger Henry took over his father's fencing academy in Bond Street from his father in 1817. He subsequently moved it to St. James's Street (1830-1896). He was superintendent of sword exercise to the British Army and the Royal Navy (1833-1852).

Death
Henry died in 1852. He is buried in Kensal Green Cemetery.

Selected publications
The Infantry Sword Exercise. 1845.
 The Reminiscences of Henry Angelo, 1830

References

1780 births
1852 deaths
Burials at Kensal Green Cemetery
English male fencers
Henry Charles, the Younger